Franklin Clark (August 2, 1801 – August 24, 1874) was a United States representative from Maine. He was born in Wiscasset, Massachusetts (now in Maine) on August 2, 1801. He attended the common schools, then engaged in the lumber and shipping business there. He was elected a member of the Maine Senate in 1847.  He was elected as a Democrat to the (Thirtieth Congress) (March 4, 1847 – March 3, 1849).  After retiring from Congress, he reengaged in the manufacture of lumber, and died in Brooklyn, New York on August 24, 1874.  His interment was in Green-Wood Cemetery, Brooklyn, Kings County, New York.

References

1801 births
1874 deaths
Democratic Party Maine state senators
People from Wiscasset, Maine
Burials at Green-Wood Cemetery
Businesspeople from Maine
Democratic Party members of the United States House of Representatives from Maine
19th-century American politicians
19th-century American businesspeople